The Bön Kangyur and Tengyur are collections of canonical texts of the Tibetan Bön religion. Like the Tibetan Buddhist canon, the Bönpo canon consists of two complementary collections: the Kangyur or translated word, consisting of 179 large volumes containing teachings attributed to  Tonpa Shenrab, the legendary founder of the Bön religion; and the Tengyur  containing commentaries on those teachings, as well as cycles of additional instructions, biographies, and rituals.
These canonical texts were supposedly translated from original texts in the Zhang-Zhung language.

Bön Kangyur
The 179 volume Bön Kangyur consists of five sections:
 
1. Sutra section known as the Do-de(vol. 1-74)
2. section known as the Boom-de (vol. 75-144)
3. Mantra (or Tantra) section known as the Ngak-de   (vol. 145-170)
4. Mind (or Dzogchen) section  (vol. 171-178)
5. Lineage of the teachings   (vol. 179)

Bön Tengyur
This collection, also known as the Katen བཀའ་བརྟེན། (Treatises Relying on the Word), contains commentaries on the Kangyur, as well as instructions for practitioners.

Sources

Notes

External links
 Bön Kangyur at BDRC
 Bön Tengyur at BDRC

 
Tibetan literature
Bon
Religion in the Himalayas